The 1947 Xavier Musketeers football team was an American football team that represented Xavier University as an independent during the 1947 college football season. In its first season under head coach Ed Kluska, the team compiled a 4–4–1 record.

Schedule

References

Xavier
Xavier Musketeers football seasons
Xavier Musketeers football